Charles Tolle is a paralympic athlete from France competing mainly in category T53 wheelchair racing events.

Charles has competed in 3 Paralympics, winning 3 medals in two games.  He first competed in the 1996 Summer Paralympics where he competed in the 200m and 400m, and won a gold medal as part of the French 4 × 400 m relay team.  In the 2000 Summer Paralympics he won a bronze in the individual 400m as well as helping the French relay team defend there Gold medal and competing in the 200m and marathon.  His third appearance proved to be his least successful, competing in the 2004 Summer Paralympics he competed in the 200m, 400m and 800m without winning a medal.

References

External links 
 

Paralympic athletes of France
Athletes (track and field) at the 1992 Summer Paralympics
Athletes (track and field) at the 1996 Summer Paralympics
Athletes (track and field) at the 2000 Summer Paralympics
Athletes (track and field) at the 2004 Summer Paralympics
Paralympic gold medalists for France
Paralympic bronze medalists for France
Living people
French male wheelchair racers
Medalists at the 1996 Summer Paralympics
Medalists at the 2000 Summer Paralympics
Year of birth missing (living people)
Paralympic medalists in athletics (track and field)
20th-century French people
21st-century French people